Jana Kolukanova (born August 4, 1981) is a retired Estonian swimmer, who specialized in sprint freestyle events. She is a two-time Olympian, multiple-times champion of Estonia and one of the top European sprinters of her generation.

Kolukanova made her Olympic debut as a 19-year-old at the 2000 Summer Olympics in Sydney where she competed in the women's 50 m freestyle. She reached the semifinals by winning the swim-off against European champion Mette Jacobsen of Denmark and Ana Belén Palomo of Spain. She set a new Estonian record in two consecutive swims, first in the prelims (25.96) and then in the three-person swim-off a few hours later. Followed by an evening session, Kolukanova finished her semifinal run with a time of 26.03, just seven hundredths of a second (0.07) outside her record.

After her performances in Sydney, Kolukanova was heavily recruited by U.S. universities and decided to attend Auburn University in Auburn, Alabama to swim for Auburn Tigers under head coach David Marsh. She studied psychology and graduated as a 19-time All-American, All-SEC selection, SEC Academic Honor Roll member as well as an Academic All-American. She also won 3 NCAA team championships while at Auburn.

Kolukanova qualified for the 2004 Summer Olympics in Athens by clearing a FINA standard entry time of 56.10 at the European Championships in Madrid, Spain. She competed in the women's 100 m freestyle and challenged seven other swimmers in heat four, including her college teammate Eileen Coparropa of Panama. She finished three tenths of a second (0.30) behind Israel's Anna Gostomelsky in 57.45 and did not advance into the semifinals.

At the 2005 FINA World Championships in Montreal, Quebec, Canada, Kolukanova placed 8th in the 50 m freestyle (25.56), and 14th in the 100 m freestyle (55.81, a new Estonian record). Earlier in the semifinals, she posted a time of 25.26 to reach the final in the 50 m freestyle, adding another Estonian record to her laundry list of accomplishments.

Kolukanova qualified for the 2008 Summer Olympics in Beijing, but did not compete due to injury.

Kolukanova was a regular participant on the FINA Swimming World Cup circuit throughout her career.

See also
 List of Estonian records in swimming

References

External links
Profile – ESBL 
Player Bio – Auburn Tigers

1981 births
Living people
Olympic swimmers of Estonia
Swimmers at the 2000 Summer Olympics
Swimmers at the 2004 Summer Olympics
Estonian female freestyle swimmers
Swimmers from Tallinn
Auburn Tigers women's swimmers
Estonian people of Russian descent
Estonian expatriate sportspeople in the United States